Nebulin-related-anchoring protein (N-RAP) is a protein that in humans is encoded by the NRAP gene. N-RAP is a muscle-specific isoform belonging to the nebulin family of proteins. This family is composed of 5 members: N-RAP, nebulin, nebulette, LASP-1 and LASP-2. N-RAP is involved in both myofibrillar myogenesis during development and cell-cell connections in mature muscle.

Structure 
N-RAP is a 197 kDa protein composed of 1730 amino acids. As a member of the nebulin family of proteins, N-RAP is characterized by 35 amino acid stretches of ‘‘nebulin repeats’’, which are actin binding domains containing a conserved SDxxYK motif. Like nebulin, groups of seven single repeats within N-RAP form “super repeats”, which incorporate a single conserved motif WLKGIGW at the end of the third repeat. A unique feature of NRAP relative to nebulin is its N-terminal cysteine-rich LIM domain, a feature shared with LASP-1 and LASP-2.

Function 
An important role has been implicated for N-RAP in myofibrilar organization during cardiomyocyte development. It is clear that NRAP is critical for normal α-actinin-dependent organization of myofibrils in cardiomyocytes, as knock-down of N-RAP protein levels causes myofbrillar disassembly in embryonic cardiomyocytes. Specifically, studies suggest that NRAP super repeats may be an essential scaffold for organizing alpha-actinin and actin into sarcomereic I-Z-I complexes in premyofibrils, and dynamic imaging studies have shown that N-RAP departs from the I-Z-I complexes upon completion of actin thin filament assembly. In adult cardiac muscle, N-RAP colocalizes to intercalated discs, where it functions to anchor terminal actin filaments to the sarcolemma. It has been suggested that its role in adult muscle is force transduction from the sarcomere to the extracellular matrix.

Clinical significance 
Though no known direct link exists between N-RAP mutations and human cardiomyopathies, N-RAP has been shown to be significantly upregulated in murine models of dilated cardiomyopathy. This has been hypothesized to be an adaptive response to correct for disorganized actin thin filament architecture at intercalated disc junctions in cardiomyocytes during dilated cardiomyopathy.

References

Further reading

External links 
 .